General elections were held in Cambodia on 21 December 1947. The Democratic Party won 44 of the 75 seats.

Results

References

Cambodia
Elections in Cambodia
1947 in Cambodia
Election and referendum articles with incomplete results